The Merchant Shipping (Pollution) Act 2006 (c 8) is an Act of the Parliament of the United Kingdom. It has three main purposes: to give effect to the Supplementary Fund Protocol 2003, to give effect to Annex IV of the MARPOL Convention, and to amend section 178(1) of the Merchant Shipping Act 1995.

Supplementary Fund Protocol

Section 1 of the Act allows the government to enact provisions giving effect to the 2003 Protocol by affirmative Order in Council.  The protocol, drawn up under the auspices of the International Maritime Organization establishes an international fund which will pay out up to $1 billion in International Monetary Fund special drawing rights in cases of oil slicks and other environmental pollution.

MARPOL Convention

Section 2 of the Act amends section 128(1) of the Merchant Shipping Act 1995 by inserting an extra paragraph extending the government's power to make provisions by Order in Council to include giving effecttion to the convention.

Merchant Shipping Act 1995
Section 3 of the Act amends section 178(1) of the Merchant Shipping Act 1995 to restrict claims to being enforced within three years of the damage occurring, whereas previously it had been restricted to within three years after "the claim against the Fund arose", and within six years of the damage occurring.

See also
Merchant Shipping Act
Environmental issues with shipping

References
Halsbury's Statutes,

External links
The Merchant Shipping (Pollution) Act 2006, as amended from the National Archives.
The Merchant Shipping (Pollution) Act 2006, as originally enacted from the National Archives.
Explanatory notes to the Merchant Shipping (Pollution) Act 2006.
IMO article on the 2003 Protocol
ePolitix article on the Act

United Kingdom Acts of Parliament 2006
Ocean pollution
2006 in transport
Admiralty law in the United Kingdom
Environmental law in the United Kingdom
2006 in the environment
Shipping in the United Kingdom